Octave Marie Terrienne MSC (9 September 1902 – 4 March 1994) was the Roman Catholic bishop of the apostolic vicariate of the Gilbert Islands from 1937 until 1961, when Pierre Guichet succeeded him.

He was bishop of Menelaites (a titular see) from 1938 to 1961 as Vicar Apostolic of the Gilbert and Ellice Islands. After building there the biggest church of the colony in 1936, Bishop Terrienne established the vicariate see in Tanaeang, on North Tabiteuea, instead of Ocean Island, headquarters of the British Colony, or Tarawa, the former capital, where it was transferred at the end of 1950s.

He was ordained Priest on 27 January 1929 and consecrated Bishop on 25 June 1938 at Nantes Cathedral. He was then the youngest Roman Catholic bishop at only 36.

References

External links
 The British Museum: Bishop Octave-Marie Terrienne
 Diocese of Tarawa and Nauru

1902 births
French Roman Catholic bishops in Oceania
20th-century Roman Catholic bishops in British Overseas Territories
French expatriates in Kiribati
1994 deaths
Roman Catholic bishops of Tarawa and Nauru
Missionaries of the Sacred Heart